John David "Moon" Martin (October 31, 1945  – May 11, 2020) was an American singer-songwriter and guitarist.

Career
Born in Altus, Oklahoma, United States, Martin gained recognition in the 1970s as a pop artist and composer. Originally a rockabilly artist, he wrote the songs "Bad Case of Loving You (Doctor, Doctor)", made famous by the English singer Robert Palmer, and "Cadillac Walk", made famous by the American singer Willy DeVille.

Martin scored five minor hits of his own with "Rolene" (No. 30 US, No. 77 Australia), "No Chance" (No. 50 US), both in 1979, "Signal For Help" (No. 60 Australia) in 1981, "X-ray Vision", (No. 99) and "Aces For You" (No. 95) both in Australia in 1982. His 1982 song, "X-Ray Vision" was an MTV hit music video.

He allegedly was given the nickname "Moon" because many of his songs had the word moon in the lyrics.

Martin died on May 11, 2020 of natural causes in Encino, California at the age of 74.

On October 31, 2022, Midnight Moon, a posthumous album, is released, only available on several music streaming services.

Discography

Studio albums
 Shots from a Cold Nightmare (1978, Capitol Records)
 Escape from Domination (1979, Capitol) - #80, Billboard 200; #67, RPM Magazine Top 100
 Street Fever (1980, Capitol) - #138, Billboard 200, #63 AUS
 Mystery Ticket (1982, Capitol) - #205, Billboard 200
 Mixed Emotions (1985, Capitol France)
 Dreams on File (1992, Fnac France)
 Cement Monkey (1993, CORE) 
 Lunar Samples (1995, CORE)
 Louisiana Juke-Box (1999, Sonodisc France-Eagle UK)
 Midnight Moon (2022, Joanne Gough)

Live albums
 Bad News Live (1993, Fnac France)

Compilation albums
 The Very Best Of (1999, EMI Sweden, 1978-1982)
 Shots from a Cold Nightmare + Escape from Domination (1995, EMI Special Markets, Demon Records)
 "Street Fever + Mystery Ticket (1995, EMI Special Markets, Edsel Records)

References

External links
 Moon Martin at VH1
 

1945 births
2020 deaths
American male singer-songwriters
People from Altus, Oklahoma
Singer-songwriters from Oklahoma